Parti Bangsa Malaysia (English: Malaysian Nation Party, abbreviated PBM), is a registered centre-right political party in Malaysia. The party was founded as the Sarawak Workers Party before being handed over in November 2021. The party is currently represented by one Member of Parliament (MP) after the 15th general election (GE15).

History 
At the beginning, Sarawak Workers Party (abbreviated SWP) was a political party based in Sarawak, Malaysia formed in 2012 as a splinter party of Sarawak Peoples' Party (PRS) by some former PRS members headed by dissident leader Sng Chee Hua, who took over the Sabah People's Front (SPF) and rebranded into the new SWP which was Barisan Nasional (BN)-friendly. The senior Sng retired and handed-over the SWP president position to his son, Larry Sng Wei Shien in 2013.

Larry Sng later resigned from SWP in April 2016 after failure to be accepted into state BN coalition. During his absence, the party under Engga Unchat's leadership formed Gabungan Anak Sarawak (GASAK) with Sarawak People's Aspiration Party (ASPIRASI) and New Sarawak Native People's Party (PBDSB).

Larry Sng, after five-years active around as an Independent and People's Justice Party (PKR), rejoined the SWP party in November 2021 as deputy president and revealed the change of the party name to Parti Bangsa Malaysia (PBM) which Registrar of Societies has earlier approved on 14 October 2021. Mohd. Sukri Yusri meanwhile will be temporary president of the new party. All members of previous SWP central leadership resigned and the party is to release its leadership lineup in the process due.

On 8 January 2022, Larry Sng, as the newly appointed president of PBM, did not deny the possibility of joining the BN coalition in anticipation for the 15th general election. PBM had declared its support for Gabungan Parti Sarawak (GPS) during the 2021 Sarawak state election. As the GASAK's policy not cooperating with Peninsular-based or Malaysia-wide parties, the Sarawak opposition coalition which initially consists of ASPIRASI, PBDSB and SWP is not expected to continue any alliance with the new PBM. Meanwhile Nor Hizwan Ahmad, the Penggerak Komuniti Negara NGO president and also among the PKR members who turned to Malaysian United Indigenous Party (BERSATU) in the 2020 Sheraton Move, had claimed that its 53,109 NGO members would join the new party.

Leadership crisis and the 15th general election (2022) 
On 26 May 2022, Zuraida Kamaruddin resigned from BERSATU and applied to join PBM. Zuraida's membership was approved on 9 June and she was also appointed as the party's president-designate. The decision of the appointment was approved by the party's political bureau and the supreme council. Inaugural PBM president Larry Sng issued a statement on 2 October that he is still the party president and he has not resigned from the position due to the upcoming 15th general election (GE15).

On 8 October, PBM announced the appointment of Zuraida as the new party president after a supreme council meeting held on 7 October. Sng was quoted as saying he accepts the supreme council's decision and will not challenge the matter. However, on 26 October, Sng released a statement saying he is still the legitimate party president according to the Registrar of Societies (RoS) records (later confirmed by the RoS director-general on 30 October) and suspended secretary-general Nor Hizwan Ahmad and information chief Zakaria Abdul Hamid (who are reportedly Zuraida's allies) for holding the supreme council meeting to appoint Zuraida as party president without his knowledge and consent. Nor Hizwan dismissed the suspension, claiming that only Zuraida, as the current party president, can suspend him and Zakaria from the party. On 29 October, Sng announced the suspension of Zuraida and 12 supreme council members, which was also dismissed by deputy president and supreme council member Haniza Talha. On 2 November, PBM released a statement that Sng is recognised as the rightful party president and will sign the party's candidate appointment letters to contest in GE15 with Zuraida reverting to her previous position of president-designate.

PBM contested for five parlimentary seats (Hulu Selangor, Kapar, Labuan, Ampang and Julau) and two state assembly seats (Tronoh and Bugaya) in GE15. PBM lost all but one seats contested, with Sng retaining the Julau parliamentary seat. Most notably, Zuraida lost the Ampang parliamentary seat to PKR's Rodziah Ismail and managed to garner only 4,589 votes. Zuraida had previously won the Ampang parliamentary seat in the last three general elections under PKR. PBM joined the coalition government under the leadership of Anwar Ibrahim but was not given a cabinet position.

On 24 December, Sng was reported to have sent show-cause letters to the 13 suspended party members after they have failed to attend a supreme council meeting. After failing to respond to the 26 December deadline, the party's disciplinary committee have decided to sack Zuraida and 10 of the 13 suspended members from the party.

Post GE15 (2023-) 
On 14 February 2023, Sng announced a new supreme council line-up for the party, including former Sri Aman MP Masir Kujat as the new party secretary general.

List of PBM presidents

PBM state chairman 
 PBM Perlis: Vacant
 PBM Kedah: Vacant
 PBM Kelantan: Nik Azwan Mustapha
 PBM Terengganu: Mohamiza Mohamad Sarap
 PBM Penang: Enson Neoh Gim Khoon
 PBM Perak: Azhari Hamid
 PBM Pahang: Vacant
 PBM Selangor: Larry Sng Wei Shien
 PBM Federal Territory: Abdul Rahman Hashim
 PBM Negeri Sembilan: Vacant
 PBM Malacca: Chua Lian Chye
 PBM Johor: Steven Choong Shiau Yoon
 PBM Sabah: Jupperi Lenson
 PBM Sarawak: Larry Sng Wei Shien

PBM leadership structure 

 President:
 Larry Sng
 Deputy President:
 Wong Judat
 Steven Choong Shiau Yoon
 Senior Vice President: 
 Paul Yong Choo Kiong
 Vice President: 
 Chua Lian Chye
 Secretary General: 
 Masir Kujat
 Deputy Secretary General:
 Jenny Chiew
 Organisational Secretary:
 Elections Director:
 Information Chief: 
 Che Hisham Sharudin Che Hamat Nordin
 Deputy Information Chief:
 Treasurer Chief:
 Engga Unchat
 Deputy Treasurer Chief:
 Youth Chief: 
 Che Hisham Sharudin Che Hamat Nordin
 Deputy Youth Chief:

 Vice Youth Chief:
 
 
 
 Women Chief:
 Agnes Padan
 Deputy Women Chief:
 Women Youth Chief: 
 Central Committee Members:
 Lavenia Mawas Munan
 Muniraa Abu Bakar
 Pagrios Petrus
 Johan Sawajaan
 David Munan
 Jamila Bibi Abdul Basah

Elected representatives

Dewan Negara (Senate)

Senators 

 His Majesty's appointee:

Dewan Rakyat (House of Representatives)

Members of Parliament of the 15th Malaysian Parliament 

PBM has 1 member in the House of Representatives:

Dewan Undangan Negeri (State Legislative Assembly)

Malaysian State Assembly Representatives 

Selangor State Legislative Assembly
Penang State Legislative Assembly
Negeri Sembilan State Legislative Assembly
Kedah State Legislative Assembly

Johor State Legislative Assembly
Perak State Legislative Assembly
Perlis State Legislative Assembly

Pahang State Legislative Assembly
Sabah State Legislative Assembly
Sarawak State Legislative Assembly 

Malacca State Legislative Assembly
Kelantan State Legislative Assembly
Terengganu State Legislative Assembly

General election results

State election results

See also 
 Politics of Malaysia
 List of political parties in Malaysia
 Barisan Nasional
 Gabungan Parti Sarawak
 Perikatan Nasional

References

Notes

External links
 Official website of SWP
 Official Facebook page

Political parties in Sarawak
Political parties established in 2012
2012 establishments in Malaysia